, nicknamed , (born March 7, 1977 in Tokyo) is a Japanese stage, film, and television actor. Trained as a stage actor at the Bungaku-za after graduating from Chuo University, he first began to appear on Japanese TV in small roles in 2008, and then in films in 2011.

Filmography

Television

Film

Awards

References

External links

Profile at Hirata Office Co. website

1977 births
Living people
Japanese male television actors
Taiga drama lead actors